Rock Me: The Best of Great White is a compilation album released by the American hard rock band Great White in 2006.

Track listing 
"Rock Me" – 8:18
"Once Bitten, Twice Shy" – 5:16
"Save Your Love" – 4:38
"Love Removal Machine" – 4:30
"Again and Again" – 3:38
"Ready for Love" – 4:40
"Tangled Up in Blue" – 5:55
"Burning House of Love" – 3:51
"Ain't No Way to Treat a Lady" – 2:34
"Sin City" – 4:38
"No Matter What" – 2:44
"Lady Love" – 3:12

References 

2006 greatest hits albums
Great White compilation albums
Cleopatra Records compilation albums